This is a list of notable events in music that took place in the year 1975.



Specific locations
1975 in British music
1975 in Norwegian music

Specific genres
1975 in country music
1975 in heavy metal music
1975 in jazz

Events

January–April
January 2 – New York City U.S. District Court Judge Richard Owen rules that former Beatle John Lennon and his lawyers can have access to Department of Immigration files pertaining to his deportation case.
January 5 – The Wiz, a new musical version of the classic Wizard of Oz story, opens at Broadway's Majestic Theater in New York City.
January 6 – Approximately 1.000 Led Zeppelin fans, waiting for tickets to go on sale for Led Zeppelin's February 4 concert, cause an estimated $30,000 in damage to the lobby of the Boston Garden. The fans reportedly broke chairs and doors and caused other damage to the building. Boston Mayor Kevin White cancels the upcoming show.
January 8 – Three Led Zeppelin concerts at Madison Square Garden sell out in a record four hours.
January 12 – "The Warner Brothers Music Show" begins a nine-city, 18-show tour of Europe. The tour included Warner Brothers acts Little Feat, Tower of Power, the Doobie Brothers, Bonaroo, Montrose, and Graham Central Station.
January 24 – Jazz pianist Keith Jarrett plays the solo improvisation 'The Köln Concert' at the Cologne Opera, which, recorded live, becomes the best-selling piano recording in history.
February 13 – The film Slade In Flame, starring the members of Slade, premieres at the Metropole Theatre in London.
February 21 – John Lennon releases his Rock 'n' Roll LP, featuring his favorite rock songs from the 1950s. To promote the album he conducts a telephone interview with 20 rock radio stations simultaneously.
March 1 – The 17th Annual Grammy Awards are presented in New York, hosted by Andy Williams. Stevie Wonder's Fulfillingness' First Finale wins Album of the Year, Olivia Newton-John's "I Honestly Love You" wins Record of the Year and Barbra Streisand's "The Way We Were" wins Song of the Year. Marvin Hamlisch wins Best New Artist. 
March 2 – Los Angeles Police make a routine traffic stop that turns out to be Paul McCartney and his wife Linda. Linda is arrested for having 170 to 225 grams (six to eight ounces) of marijuana in her pocketbook.
March 21 – Alice Cooper, now a solo artist, begins the Welcome to My Nightmare tour in Kalamazoo, Michigan. The elaborate show is among the largest stage spectacles of the decade.
March 22 – In the Eurovision Song Contest in Stockholm, Sweden, the Dutch group Teach-In wins with the song "Ding-A-Dong".
March 23 – Promoter Bill Graham stages the S.N.A.C.K. (Students Need Athletics, Culture and Kicks) charity concert at Kezar Stadium in San Francisco, California, to benefit the city's educational system. Almost 60,000 people come to see The Grateful Dead, The Doobie Brothers, Santana, Jefferson Starship, Tower of Power, Eddie Palmieri, Joan Baez, Graham Central Station and Neil Young joined by members of The Band along with a surprise appearance by Bob Dylan. It's the largest benefit concert in history to date.
March 26 – The film version of The Who's Tommy premieres in London.
March 29 – Jeff Beck releases the album Blow by Blow. It is the first album to be released using just his name.
April 3 – Steve Miller is arrested and charged with setting fire to the clothes and personal effects of a friend, Benita DiOrio, and resisting arrest. DiOrio drops the charges the following day.
April 7 – Ritchie Blackmore plays a final show with Deep Purple in Paris before quitting to form his own group, Rainbow.
April 17 – Cambodian singer-songwriter Sinn Sisamouth and his pregnant wife are among millions forced out of Phnom Penh by the Khmer Rouge.
April 18 – Alice Cooper's first television special, Welcome to My Nightmare: The Making of a Record Album airs.
April 24 – Pete Ham, founder of the group Badfinger, is found hanged in his London garage. His death is ruled a suicide.
April 28 – Tom Snyder interviews John Lennon on the Tomorrow Show.

May–August
May 1 – The Rolling Stones announce their forthcoming North American tour by performing Brown Sugar from a flatbed truck on Fifth Avenue in New York City. The occasion was guitarist Ronnie Wood's debut with the band.
May 10 – Stevie Wonder performs before 125,000 people at the Washington Monument as part of Human Kindness Day festivities.
June 1 – The Rolling Stones open their North American Tour in Baton Rouge, Louisiana.
June 20 – Talking Heads perform their first show at CBGB in New York.
June 23 – Alice Cooper falls off the stage during a concert in Vancouver, Canada, breaking six ribs.
June 24 – "Gens du pays", the unofficial national anthem of Quebec, is performed for the first time by Gilles Vigneault in a concert on Montreal's Mount Royal.
June 30 – Cher and Gregg Allman are married in a Las Vegas hotel suite. That same day, The Jackson 5 leave Motown for CBS Records, but the brothers are forced to change their name to The Jacksons because Motown owns the Jackson 5 name. Jermaine Jackson stays with Motown when his brothers break their contracts and leave for CBS; he is replaced by youngest Jackson brother Randy as a result.
July 4 – The Texas Senate declares the Fourth of July "Willie Nelson Day", as more than 70,000 fans visit Liberty Hill for the third annual picnic and country rock show headlined by Willie himself.
August 4 – Robert Plant and his wife Maureen are seriously injured in a car accident while vacationing on the Greek island of Rhodes. The immediate future of Led Zeppelin is cast into doubt, as Plant will not recover for quite some time.
August 9
The Bee Gees begin their mid-1970s international comeback when "Jive Talkin'" reaches #1 and goes platinum with sales over 1 million.
Renato Carosone's comeback concert after a 15-year retirement.
The first Rock Music Awards, produced by Don Kirshner, are held in Los Angeles, co-hosted by Elton John and Diana Ross. John wins "Outstanding Rock Personality of the Year". The Who's film Tommy wins "Rock Movie of the Year". 

• August 18

Elvis Presley opens his Las Vegas engagement which ends on the 20th and performs the second-to-last rendition of his 1969 record "Suspicious Minds". He also performed the 1970 hit "The Wonder of You" for the final time that year and for the final time in Vegas.
August 23 – Peter Gabriel leaves British progressive rock group Genesis.

September–December
September 15 – Pink Floyd releases their ninth album, Wish You Were Here.
September 29 – Singer Jackie Wilson suffers a massive heart attack while performing on stage in Cherry Hill, New Jersey. He survives but never physically recovers.
October 3 – The Who release their seventh studio album, The Who By Numbers.
October 7 – John Lennon finally wins his battle to stay in the United States after the New York Court of Appeals overturns Lennon's 1972 deportation order.
October 9
John Lennon and Yoko Ono become parents of Sean Ono Lennon at 2:00 AM. The birth heralds the beginning of John's temporary retirement from the music business as he vows to devote himself to family for the next five years.
Rock band Kiss earns publicity by playing the homecoming dance of Cadillac High School in Cadillac, Michigan.
October 11 – Bruce Springsteen appears at the Monmouth Arts Center (Count Basie Theater) for The Homecoming Concert.
October 18 – Simon & Garfunkel reunite on the second-ever episode of Saturday Night Live on NBC, performing "The Boxer", "Scarborough Fair", and new collaboration "My Little Town".
October 27 – Bruce Springsteen appears on the covers of both Time and Newsweek magazines on the same week.
October 30 – Bob Dylan's Rolling Thunder Revue tour begins.
November 6 – The Sex Pistols play their first concert at St. Martin's School of Art in London.
November 21 – Queen's "Bohemian Rhapsody" goes to number one in the U.K., where it remains for five weeks of 1975 and four weeks of 1976.
December 6 – The Who set the record for largest indoor concert at the Pontiac Silverdome, attended by 78,000 fans.
December 10 – The John Denver holiday special Rocky Mountain Christmas airs on ABC.
December 18 – The official break-up of Faces is announced at a London press conference. Rod Stewart will continue his solo career while Ronnie Wood is widely expected to be announced as an official member of The Rolling Stones in the near future.
December 24 – The first issue of Punk magazine is released with a January 1976 cover date. A drawing of Lou Reed is on the cover.
December 25 – Bassist Steve Harris forms Iron Maiden, drawing the name from a torture device mentioned in The Man in the Iron Mask.
December 31 
 The fourth annual New Year's Rockin' Eve airs on ABC, with performances by Average White Band, Melissa Manchester, Freddy Fender, and Neil Sedaka.
 Elvis Presley performs before the biggest audience of his career, at Pontiac, Michigan's Silverdome. During the show, Elvis rips his pants onstage and has to leave to change.

Also in 1975 
John Rutter becomes Director of Music at Clare College, Cambridge.
Billy Davis Jr. and Marilyn McCoo leave the 5th Dimension and start solo careers.
The Goodies have five top twenty singles (in the UK) becoming, according to Bill Oddie, "the first, the only and the most successful comedy rockers".
Ramones sign to Sire Records.
First release of "And the Band Played Waltzing Matilda", by John Currie, on Australian label M7.

Bands formed
See Musical groups established in 1975

Bands disbanded

See Musical groups disestablished in 1975

Albums released

January

February

March

April

May

June

July

August

September

October

November

December

Release date unknown

Afro-Filipino – Joe Bataan
Born to Be with You – Dion DiMucci + produced by Phil Spector
Chuck Berry – Chuck Berry
Come Again – the Jaggerz
Confusion – Fela Kuti
Crack the Sky – Crack The Sky
Cut Me While I'm Hot (The Sixties Sessions) - Dr. John
Das schönste im Leben – Die Flippers
Dreadlocks Dread – Big Youth
Ego Ti Eho Ke Ti Tha 'Ho – Tolis Voskopoulos
El amor – Julio Iglesias
Expensive Shit – Fela Kuti
Fox – Fox (debut)
A Funky Thide of Sings – Billy Cobham
Goodbye – Gene Ammons
High Step – Paul Chambers and John Coltrane
Home Plate – Bonnie Raitt
Journey to Love – Stanley Clarke
Juice Newton & Silver Spur – Juice Newton and Silver Spur
The Köln Concert – Keith Jarrett
Live/Hhaï – Magma – live
Mel Tormé live at the Maisonette – Mel Tormé
Montreux '75 – Ella Fitzgerald
Moxy – Moxy
Music Keeps Me Together - Taj Mahal
Nasty Gal - Betty Davis
Neu! '75 – Neu!
Nils Lofgren – Nils Lofgren

No Mystery – Return to Forever
No Reservations – Blackfoot
Not a Little Girl Anymore – Linda Lewis
Now – The Dubliners
Old No. 1 – Guy Clark
The Other Side of Me – Andy Williams
Pampered Menial- Pavlov's Dog
Power and the Passion – Eloy
Pre-Creedence – The Golliwogs – compilation
Rimmel – Francesco de Gregori
The Rocky Horror Picture Show – various artists – soundtrack
Ronnie Drew – Ronnie Drew (solo debut)
Say It Ain't So (album) - Murray Head
Solstice – Ralph Towner
The Sweet Singles Album – Sweet
Taking Off – David Sanborn
Tails of Illusion – Fox
Tea Break Over–Back on Your 'Eads! – IF
Trapeze – Trapeze
Two Steps Forward, One Step Back – Patrick Sky
Velvet Donkey – Ivor Cutler

Biggest hit singles
The following songs achieved the highest chart positions
in the charts of 1975.

Chronological table of U.S. and UK number one hit singles

Note: best sellers of the year are bold.

Top 40 Chart hit singles

Other selected singles

Notable singles

Other Notable singles
"Gamblin' Bar Room Blues" b/w "Shake That Thing" - The Sensational Alex Harvey Band

Published popular music
 "And All That Jazz" w. Fred Ebb m. John Kander. Introduced by Chita Rivera in the musical Chicago
 "Anytime (I'll Be There)"     w.m. Paul Anka
 "At Seventeen" w.m. Janis Ian
 "Calypso"     w.m. John Denver
 "I'm Not in Love"     w.m. Graham Gouldman & Eric Stewart
 "I'm Sorry"     w.m. John Denver
 "Love Will Keep Us Together"     w.m. Neil Sedaka & Howard Greenfield
 "Mamma Mia"     w.m. Benny Andersson, Stig Anderson & Björn Ulvaeus
 "Movin' On Up" w.m. Jeff Barry and Ja'net Dubois, theme from the TV series The Jeffersons
 "New York State of Mind" w.m. Billy Joel
 "One"     w. Edward Kleban m. Marvin Hamlisch
 "Rockin' All Over the World" w.m. John C. Fogerty
 "Wasted Days and Wasted Nights"     w.m. Freddy Fender & Wayne Duncan
 "The Way I Want To Touch You"     w.m. Toni Tennille
 "What I Did For Love"     w. Edward Kleban m. Marvin Hamlisch
 "You"     w.m. Tom Snow

Classical music
Samuel Adler – Symphony No. 5, We are the Echoes
Osvaldas Balakauskas – Sonata of the Mountains
Claude Bolling and Jean-Pierre Rampal – Suite for Flute and Jazz Piano
Mario Davidovsky – Scenes from Shir ha-Shirim for soprano, two tenors, bass soli and chamber ensemble
Klaus Huber – Blätterlos for piano
Wojciech Kilar – Bogurodzica for mixed choir and orchestra
Theo Loevendie – Concerto for Bass Clarinet and Orchestra, Incantations
Witold Lutosławski – Les Espaces du sommeil
Krzysztof Meyer
Sonata for piano, No. 5
Sonata for solo violin
Frederic Rzewski – The People United Will Never Be Defeated!
Karlheinz Stockhausen 
Harlekin, for clarinet, Nr. 42
Der kleine Harlekin, for clarinet, Nr. 42½
Musik im Bauch, for six percussionists and music boxes, Nr. 41 
Tierkreis,  for a melody and/or chording instrument, Nr. 41½ 
Alexander Vustin – The Word
Dmitri Shostakovich – Sonata for Viola and Piano, Op. 147 (his final work)

Opera
Viktor Ullmann – Der Kaiser von Atlantis (16 December, Bellevue Centre, Amsterdam)
John Rutter – Bang! (14 March, Fairfield Halls, Croydon)
Aulis Sallinen – The Horseman (17 June, Savonlinna Opera Festival)

Jazz

Musical theatre
 Chicago – Broadway production opened at the 46th Street Theatre and ran for 936 performances
 A Chorus Line (Marvin Hamlisch and Edward Kleban) – Broadway production opened at the Shubert Theatre and ran for 6137 performances, the longest run of any Broadway musical at the time
 A Little Night Music (Stephen Sondheim) – London production
 Dance With Me – Broadway production opened at the Mayfair Theatre and ran for 396 performances
 The Wiz – Broadway production opened at the Majestic Theatre and ran for 1672 performances
 Pacific Overtures – Broadway production opened at the Winter Garden Theatre and ran for 192 performances

Musical films
 At Long Last Love
 Funny Lady
 Lisztomania
 The Magic Flute
 The Rocky Horror Picture Show
 Tommy

Births

January
January 2
Doug Robb (Hoobastank)
Chris Cheney, Australian rock musician (The Living End)
January 3 – Thomas Bangalter (Daft Punk)
January 5 – Bradley Cooper, American singer, actor, film maker, voice actor and producer (A Star Is Born, 2018, starring Lady Gaga)
January 8 – Harris Jayaraj, Indian film composer and producer
January 13 – Jason King, radio DJ
January 15 
 Edith Bowman, British radio DJ
 Belinda Chapple, Australian singer, actress and creative director
January 17 – Rami Yacoub, Swedish-born Palestinian music producer and songwriter (Cheiron Studios and Maratone) 
January 24 – Paul Marazzi, English singer (A1)
January 28 – Lee Latchford-Evans, British singer (Steps)
January 29 – Kelly Packard, American singer-actress-hostess
January 30 – Yumi Yoshimura, Japanese singer (Puffy Amiyumi)

February
February 1 – Big Boi (OutKast)
February 4 – Natalie Imbruglia, Australian singer-songwriter, model and actress
February 5 – Adam Carson, drummer (AFI)
February 6 – Tomoko Kawase, Japanese singer
February 7 – Wes Borland (Limp Bizkit)
February 14 – Scott Owen, Australian rock musician (The Living End)
February 17 – Harisu, South Korean singer, model and actress
February 18 – Simon Kvamm, Danish singer, keyboard player, and actor (Nephew)
February 19 – Daniel Adair, Canadian rock drummer (Nickelback)
February 20 – Brian Littrell, American singer (Backstreet Boys)
February 21 – Heri Joensen, Faroese rock musician (Týr)
 February 22 - Sébastien Tellier, a independent French singer, songwriter and multi-instrumentalist (Worked with Dita Von Teese) 
February 23 – Robert Lopez, American composer and lyricist of musicals

March
March 4 – Hawksley Workman, Canadian rock singer-songwriter
March 8 – Peggy Zina, Greek singer
March 10 – Jerry Horton (Papa Roach
March 11 – Big Boy, Puerto Rican reggaeton and hip hop rapper
March 12 – Kelle Bryan, British singer (Eternal)
March 15 – will.i.am, American musician, rapper, singer, songwriter, DJ, record producer, entrepreneur (The Black Eyed Peas)
March 17
Justin Hawkins, English singer-songwriter, musician, guitarist (The Darkness)
Jairzinho Oliveira, Brazilian singer/songwriter/composer
March 18 – Sutton Foster, American actress, singer and dancer
March 19 – Brann Dailor, American drummer and singer (Mastodon)
March 25 – Melanie Blatt, English singer-songwriter and actress (All Saints)
March 27 – Fergie, (Stacy Ferguson) American singer-songwriter, dancer (The Black Eyed Peas)

April
April 7 – Karin Dreijer, Swedish singer-songwriter and record producer 
April 8 – Anouk (singer), Dutch singer-songwriter and musician
April 10 – Chris Carrabba, American rock musician (Dashboard Confessional)
April 14 – Stefano Miceli, Italian conductor and pianist
22 April – Anders Nyström, Swedish guitarist (Katatonia & Bloodbath)
23 April 
 Jonsi, Icelandic musician and member of Sigur Ros
 Olga Kern, Russian pianist
April 26
Joey Jordison, American musician and songwriter (Slipknot) (d. 2021)
José Pasillas (Incubus)
April 30 – Tomi Joutsen, Finnish metal musician

May
May 3 – Maksim Mrvica, Croatian crossover pianist
May 8 – Enrique Iglesias, Spanish singer-songwriter, actor and record producer
May 15
Frode Haltli, Norwegian accordionist
Peter Iwers, Swedish rock bassist (In Flames)
May 16
Tony Kakko, Finnish singer
B.Slade, American singer
May 18 – Jack Johnson, American singer-songwriter, musician and documentary film-maker 
May 19 – Jonas Renkse, Swedish vocalist (Katatonia) and bassist (Bloodbath)
May 20 – Andrew Sega, American electronic musician
May 24 – Alex Lacamoire, American musical arranger (Hamilton)
May 25 – Lauryn Hill, American singer-songwriter, rapper, record producer and actress (The Fugees)
May 27
André 3000, American rapper, singer-songwriter, record producer, dancer and actor (OutKast)
 Chrigel Glanzmann, Swiss metal singer
 ZP Theart, South African singer and songwriter
May 29 – Melanie Brown, English singer-songwriter, presenter, television personality, dancer, actress, author and model (Spice Girls)

June
June 2 – Gisle Torvik, Norwegian jazz guitarist
June 4 – Russell Brand, English actor, comedian and DJ
June 8 – Emm Gryner, Canadian singer-songwriter
June 23 – KT Tunstall, Scottish singer-songwriter and musician.
June 26 
KJ-52, American rapper (Peace of Mind)
Marie-Nicole Lemieux, Canadian operatic contralto
June 28
Jon Nödtveidt, Swedish singer (d. 2006)
Ning Baizura, Malaysian singer

July
July 1 – Sufjan Stevens, American folk musician
July 2 – Erik Ohlsson, Millencolin
July 5 – Gunnar H. Thomsen, Faroese rock bassist (Týr)
July 6 – 50 Cent, American rapper, actor, businessman, and investor 
July 9
Isaac Brock, American musician
Shona Fraser, British-born music journalist and judge
 Jessica Folcker, A swedish singers 
Jack White, American musician, singer, songwriter, record producer and actor (The White Stripes)
July 11 – Lil' Kim, American rapper
July 12 – Tracie Spencer, American singer and actress
July 14
Jaime Luis Gomez, known as "Taboo", rapper/singer of the Black Eyed Peas
Tameka Cottle known as "Tiny", American singer/songwriter member of the group Xscape
July 18
Daron Malakian (System of a Down)
M.I.A.,  British rapper, singer-songwriter, record producer, and activist
July 21 – Fredrik Johansson, Swedish rock guitarist
July 22 – Aile Asszonyi, operatic soprano
July 25 – Håvard Ellefsen (Mortiis)

August
August 5 – Eicca Toppinen, Finnish cellist (Apocalyptica)
August 7 – Gaahl, black metal vocalist
August 27 – Björn Gelotte Swedish guitarist (In Flames)
  August 27   – Mase, rapper
August 28 – Marek Szulen, electronic music composer
August 31 – Sara Ramirez, Mexican American actress, singer-songwriter, and activist

September
September 1
Natalie Bassingthwaighte, Australian actress and singer
Omar Rodríguez-López (At the drive-in, The Mars Volta)
September 3 – Redfoo, American rapper, singer, songwriter, actor, dancer, record producer and DJ
September 4 – Mark Ronson, British DJ and music producer
September 8 – Richard Hughes, British drummer (Keane)
September 9 – Michael Bublé, Canadian-Italian big band, swing, vocal jazz singer, songwriter, actor and record producer. 
September 11 – Brad Fischetti, LFO
September 16 – Shannon Noll, Australian singer
September 17 – Constantine Maroulis, American singer (Pray for the Soul of Betty)
September 20 – Asia Argento,  Italian actress, singer, model, activist and director.
September 21 
Lil Rob, Chicano rapper
U-Jean, American pop, R&B and hip-hop artist
September 22 – Mystikal, rapper
September 23 – Chris Hawkins, British radio personality
September 27 – Tim Campbell (actor), Australian stage actor, actor, singer and musician (Anthony Callea) 
September 30
 Georges-Alain Jones, French singer
 Glenn Fredly, Indonesian R&B singer and songwriter (d. 2020)

October
October 3 – India Arie, American singer-songwriter, actress, musician and record producer
October 7 
 Damian Kulash, American singer-songwriter and guitarist (OK Go and 8in8)
 Tim Minchin, British-Australian singer-songwriter, comic performer and director
October 9 
 Alain Altinoglu, French conductor
 Brandy Clark, American country music singer-songwriter
 Sean Ono Lennon, American singer-songwriter and actor, son of John Lennon and Yoko Ono
October 14 – Shaznay Lewis, English singer (All Saints)
October 27 
 Kate Havnevik, Norwegian film composer and singer-songwriter
 Max Lilja, Finnish cellist (Apocalyptica)
October 30
 Ian D'Sa, Canadian rock guitarist (Billy Talent)
 Steve Kazee, American singer and actor (Jenna Dewan)

November
November 1 – Bo Bice, American singer
November 5
Lisa Scott-Lee, Welsh singer-songwriter and dancer (Steps)
Jamie Spaniolo (Jamie Madrox), American rapper
 Keala Settle, American actress and singer. 
November 6 – Mike Herrera (MxPx)
November 8 – Ángel Corella, Spanish dancer
November 12 – Aaron Solowoniuk, Canadian rock drummer (Billy Talent)
November 14
Travis Barker, American musician, drummer and producer (blink-182)
Faye Tozer, English singer-songwriter, dancer and stage actress (Steps)
November 19 – Tamika Scott, American singer/songwriter and producer
November 20
Dierks Bentley, American singer-songwriter
Davey Havok, AFI
Jeffrey Lewis, American anti-folk singer
November 25 – Paul Mealor, composer

December
December 5 –  Paula Patton, American songwriter under the pseudonym "Max"
December 13 – Tom Delonge, American musician (blink-182)
December 14 – Justin Furstenfeld (Blue October)
December 16 – Benjamin Kowalewicz, Canadian rock lead singer (Billy Talent)
December 18 – Sia, Australian singer-songwriter, record producer and music video director (Britney Spears, Kylie Minogue, Kate Pierson) 
December 21 – Paloma Herrera, Argentine ballet dancer
December 22 – Amy Wadge, British singer-songwriter
December 23 
 Katie Underwood, Australian singer-songwriter (Bardot) 
 Lady Starlight, American  DJ and Producer, frequently worked with Lady Gaga
December 27
 Nike Ardilla, Indonesian singer (d. 1995)
 Solomun (musician), Bosnian DJ and music producer
December 30 – Yoma Komatsu, former member of the female J-Pop group BeForU

Unknown month
 Jonas Jeberg, Danish producer, singer songwriter, and musician

Deaths
January 8 – Richard Tucker, operatic tenor, 61 (heart attack)
January 11 – Max Lorenz, Wagnerian tenor, 73
January 16 – Paul Beaver, electronic jazz keyboardist, 49
January 26 – Toti Dal Monte, operatic soprano, 81
January 30 – Boris Blacher, composer, 72
February 3 – Umm Kulthum, singer, songwriter and actress
February 4 – Louis Jordan, jazz musician, 66
February 10 – Dave Alexander, bassist (The Stooges), 27 (pulmonary edema)
February 13 – Eric Thiman, English composer, 74
February 16–- Norman Treigle, operatic bass-baritone, 47
February 19 – Luigi Dallapiccola, composer, 71
February 22 – Lionel Tertis, viola player, 98
March 3 – Sandy MacPherson, theatre organist, 78
March 4 – Cornel Chiriac, Romanian record producer, broadcaster and jazz musician, 33 (murdered)
March 14 – Will Mastin, American vaudevillian, 100
March 15 – Sandy Brown, jazz musician, 46 (heart attack)
March 16 – T-Bone Walker, African-American musician, 64
March 27 – Sir Arthur Bliss, Master of the Queen's Musick, 83
April 12 – Josephine Baker, African-American dancer, 68
April 14 – Michael Flanders, lyricist, actor, humorist and singer (Flanders and Swann), 53 (intracranial berry aneurysm)
April 21 – Sir Jack Westrup, musicologist, 70
April 23 – Pete Ham, singer and songwriter (Badfinger), 27 (suicide)
May 2 – Conchita Badía, operatic soprano, 77
May 13 – Bob Wills, American Western swing bandleader, 70
May 18 – Leroy Anderson, American composer and conductor, 66
June 4 – Frida Leider, operatic soprano, 87
June 7 – Robert Schmertz, American folk musician and architect, 77
June 16 – Don Robey, songwriter and producer, 72
June 21 – David Tamkin, composer, 68
June 29 – Tim Buckley, singer-songwriter, 28 (drug overdose)
July 5 – Gilda Dalla Rizza, operatic soprano, 82
July 10 – Ernst Fischer, composer, 75
July 14 – Zutty Singleton, American jazz drummer, 77
July 19 – Lefty Frizzell, Country Music Hall of Fame singer, 47 (stroke)
August 8 – Cannonball Adderley, American saxophonist, 46
August 9 – Dmitri Shostakovich, composer, 68 (heart attack)
August 10 – Neva Carr Glyn, operatic contralto, 67
September – Flora Perini, operatic soprano, 87
September 5
Georg Ots, Estonian opera singer, 55
Bill Sprouse Jr., Christian singer and songwriter, 26 (heart attack)
September 6 – Shelton Brooks, Canadian-born African American song composer, 89
September 20 – Vincent Lopez, American bandleader, 79
October 1 – Al Jackson, Jr., R&B drummer, 39 (shot)
October 19 – Cátulo Castillo, tango composer, 69
October 28 – Oliver Nelson, jazz saxophonist, 43
October 30 – John Scott Trotter, U.S. arranger and conductor
December 8 – Gary Thain, rock bassist, 27 (heroin overdose)
December 14 – Mongezi Feza, jazz trumpeter and flautist, 30 (pneumonia)
December 17
Noble Sissle, U.S. bandleader and singer, 86
Hound Dog Taylor, blues musician, 60
December 24
Peter Gibbs, violinist
Bernard Herrmann, composer, 64
Tilly Losch, dancer and actress, 72
December 25 – Julio Cueva, trumpeter, bandleader and composer, 78

Awards

Grammy Awards
Grammy Awards of 1975

Country Music Association Awards

Eurovision Song Contest
Eurovision Song Contest 1975

Leeds International Piano Competition
Dimitri Alexeev

Sangeet Natak Akademi Fellowship
Ravi Shankar
Zubin Mehta

References

 
20th century in music
Music by year